Gridlock'd – The Soundtrack is the soundtrack to Vondie Curtis-Hall film Gridlock'd and was released on 28 January 1997 by Death Row Records and Interscope Records.

The track "Off The Hook" was originally recorded for the LBC Crew debut album Haven't You Heard? (We Givin' Something Bacc To The Street), which was later shelved and the songs were cycled through other Death Row releases. The album had two chart running singles. "Lady Heroin" was originally going to be on Sam Sneed's unreleased album Street Scholars. This is both the second to last Death Row Soundtrack Album and second to last Death Row album to be distributed by Interscope, as later in the year they would drop Death Row from their label.

"It's Over Now" was 46th on the Hot R&B/Hip-Hop Singles & Tracks, which was Danny Boy's second chart single. "Wanted Dead or Alive" was 16th in the UK and was accompanied by a music video with Snoop alone as it was filmed after the death of 2Pac, so he is only present in archive footages from the motion picture. The album itself went to top the R&B album chart also on the first place.

Commercial reception
It sold 150,500 copies in its first week debuting at #1 at the Billboard 200, slipping onto the second place the next week and still holding "US Albums: Biggest drops from the Top 3" - Top 20 14th place with its 2 to 14 dropback at the third week. The album was certified Gold by the RIAA a couple months later, selling over 500,000 copies.

Track listing

Charts

Certifications

See also
List of number-one albums of 1997 (U.S.)
List of number-one R&B albums of 1997 (U.S.)

References

1997 soundtrack albums
Albums produced by Daz Dillinger
Albums produced by Soopafly
Death Row Records soundtracks
West Coast hip hop soundtracks
G-funk soundtracks
Gangsta rap soundtracks
Comedy film soundtracks